Jason Ntaro is a Ugandan poet, a member of The Lantern Meet of Poets. He is a regular on poetry platforms in and around  Kampala. He has performed at National Book Trust (NABOTU), BAYIMBA, Poetry in Session,  Kwivuga, open mic, Azania (UCU), Mirrors, Phat fest, Guest performed with Tshila, Spoken word Rwanda, and Maurice Kiirya experience, in Uganda and beyond. He developed a following in 2011 after continually reciting his poem titled "3 years, 2 months, 5 days", a poem about an abusive relationship that results in death. The poet's performance involved removing his shoes and walking barefoot onto stage, after which he would take a deep breath.

Early life and education
Jason was born in Uganda. He lived in Kenya for sometime before leaving for The Netherlands where he grew up. He went to a European School in Bergen, in the Netherlands. He returned to Uganda and attended Green hill academy for primary education, and Kiira College Butiki and Vienna College, for his secondary education.

Published works
"One day, someday will be this day", in 
"A Song for the Drowned soul", in 
"Nonentity"
"watching the rain ", at July 2014 Poetry in Session at The Hub, Kamwokya in Kampala, Uganda
"Tug & War", at July 2014 Poetry in Session at The Hub, Kamwokya in Kampala, Uganda
"Intimacy Minus Intricacy",  at July 2014 Poetry in Session at The Hub, Kamwokya in Kampala, Uganda

References

External links 
"KWIVUGA POETRY GETS COMIC"
"Poetry In Session : Jason Ntaro 3Years, 5Months, 2Days "
"The interview and my voices"
"MY TOP 10 POETRY PERFORMANCES OF 2013"
"Poetry in Session: An intellectual revival in Kampala"
"Kwivuga makes a year in soulful, poetic way"
"Acfode hosts women to candle-lit evening "

Living people
Ugandan writers
21st-century Ugandan poets
Kumusha
Ugandan male poets
Place of birth missing (living people)
Year of birth missing (living people)
21st-century male writers